The men's shot put event at the 1980 European Athletics Indoor Championships was held on 2 March in Sindelfingen.

Results

References

Shot put at the European Athletics Indoor Championships
Shot